Voll is a small village in Klepp municipality in Rogaland county, Norway.  The village is located a short distance north of the river Figgjoelva, just north of the villages of Bore and Verdalen.  The main industries in Voll include agriculture, a Tine dairy facility, and Malm Orstad AS, an oil services company.

References

Villages in Rogaland
Klepp